Que Sentimiento! (What a Feeling) is a 1981 album by Héctor Lavoe. Fania gave Lavoe the go-ahead reluctantly, on what would be his first and only self-produced album.

Track listing
"Amor Soñado" (Arreglos musicales por: Louie Ramirez) José Nogueras 5:35
"Lo Dejé Llorando" (Arreglos musicales por: José Febles) Sammy Ayala 4:44
"Juventud" (Arreglos musicales por: Louie Ramirez) Marcelino Guerra 2:15
"Yo Ta' Cansa" (Arreglos musicales por: Edwin Torres) J. Blanco y M. Guerra 7:37
"Soy Vagabundo" (Arreglos musicales por: Luis Cruz) Enildo Padrón 5:55
"El Son" (Arreglos musicales por: Luis "Perico" Ortiz) D.R. 6:04
"Seguiré Mi Viaje" (Arreglos musicales por: José Febles) Alvaro Carrillo 4:02
"No Hay Quien Te Aguante" (Arreglos musicales por: José Madera) Héctor Lavoe y Ramón Rodríguez 4:19

References

Héctor Lavoe albums
1981 albums
Fania Records albums